Paraburkholderia terrae is a Gram-negative, nitrogen-fixing, catalase and oxidase-positive, motile bacterium with a single polar flagellum, from the genus Paraburkholderia and family Burkholderiaceae, which was isolated from a forest soil in Daejeon in South Korea.

References

terrae
Bacteria described in 2006